Acrocercops crotalistis is a moth of the family Gracillariidae, known from Peru. It was described by Edward Meyrick in 1915.

References

crotalistis
Moths of South America
Moths described in 1915